Helena Janeczek (born 1964) is an Italian novelist of Polish Jewish origin.

Life and career

Helena Janeczek was born in Munich, Germany, from a Polish family of Jews who survived the Holocaust. She moved to Italy when she was 19 and has lived there ever since. Her first book, Lezioni di tenebra (Lessons of Darkness), was published in 1997. It was a retelling of her family history and followed her journey with her mother to Auschwitz, where her mother was detained during World War II.

Her 2010 novel, Le rondini di Montecassino (Montecassino's Swallows), won the Zerilli-Marimò Prize for Italian Fiction. It follows a group of soldiers fighting in the Battle of Monte Cassino during World War II.

In 2017 she published her novel La ragazza con la Leica (The Girl with the Leica), about photographer Gerda Taro who died during the Spanish Civil War. In 2018, she won the Strega Prize, the most prestigious Italian prize for literature, for the novel, the first time in 15 years a woman had won the prize since Melania Mazzucco in 2003.

Bibliography
 Ins Freie: Gedichte (1989)
 Lezioni di tenebra (1997) 
 Cibo (2001) 
 Le rondini di Montecassino (2010) 
The Swallows of Monte Cassino (2013) 
 Bloody Cow (2012) 
 La ragazza con la Leica (2017) , 
The Girl with the Leica (2019) .

References

1964 births
Living people
Italian women writers
Italian writers
Strega Prize winners
German–Italian translators